Naceur Ben Messaoud (born 1 August 1938) is a Tunisian racewalker. He competed in the men's 50 kilometres walk at the 1964 Summer Olympics.

References

1938 births
Living people
Athletes (track and field) at the 1964 Summer Olympics
Tunisian male racewalkers
Olympic athletes of Tunisia
Place of birth missing (living people)
Mediterranean Games medalists in athletics
Athletes (track and field) at the 1963 Mediterranean Games
Athletes (track and field) at the 1967 Mediterranean Games
Mediterranean Games silver medalists for Tunisia
20th-century Tunisian people